Donashano Malama (born 1 September 1991) is a Zambian association football defender who plays for ZESCO United F.C. and the Zambia national football team.

Club career
In January 2018, Malama signed with Botola club Olympique Khouribga following the expiry of his contract at Nkana.

In January 2019, Malama moved to South African Premier Division side Chippa United F.C. signing alongside Bangaly Keita. He made his league debut for the club on 3 February 2019, coming on as a 66th minute substitute for Repo Malepe in a 1-1 away draw with Baroka F.C.

International career
Malama made his senior international debut on 28 April 2013 in a 2-0 friendly victory over Zimbabwe. He was part of the Zambia squad for the 2015 Africa Cup of Nations, and played in the final group match against Cape Verde as a substitute.

International goals
Scores and results list Zambia's goal tally first.

References

External links

1987 births
Living people
Zambian footballers
People from Chililabombwe District
Zambian expatriate footballers
Zambian expatriate sportspeople in Morocco
Zambian expatriate sportspeople in South Africa
Expatriate footballers in Morocco
Expatriate soccer players in South Africa
Nkana F.C. players
Olympique Club de Khouribga players
Chippa United F.C. players
Black Leopards F.C. players
South African Premier Division players
Zambia international footballers
2015 Africa Cup of Nations players
Association football defenders
Zambia A' international footballers
2016 African Nations Championship players
2018 African Nations Championship players
ZESCO United F.C. players